Dickson Hill is a small community in northeast Markham, Ontario, Canada, located near Highway 48 and 19th Avenue, on the border to Whitchurch-Stouffville.

Unlike other parts of Markham, the area around Dickson Hill has remained largely agricultural. The hamlet has a small church and a school. The original school house, built in 1861, has been relocated to Black Creek Pioneer Village in north-west Toronto.

Transportation
The Toronto/Markham Airport is located just south of Dickson Hill.

The Stouffville-Union Station GO Transit bus route connects Dickson Hill with Markham, Stouffville, and Toronto.

There is a proposed development of an international airport immediately south-east of Whitchurch-Stouffville (the Pickering Airport lands). The approach for one of the three landing strips would be directly over Dickson Hill, with planes descending above the community from an elevation of 360 metres to 330 metres. The plan anticipates 11.9 million passengers per year (or 32,600 per day) by 2032. A "Needs Assessment Study" was completed by the Greater Toronto Airports Authority for the federal government in May 2010. After a "due diligence review," Transport Canada released the report in July 2011, which identified the most likely time range for the need of the airport to be 2027-2029, and confirmed the site layout proposed in the 2004 Draft Plan Report.

Dickson Hill Road is the original alignment of Highway 48, but became a local secondary road to reduce non-local traffic. In 2021 the lower section was severed; thus the road ends with a dead end. An emergency gate is the only means for authorized road users to bypass the closure.

Education

The former Dickson Hill Public School is now a private school after the former public elementary school closed in 2002 by the York Region District School Board with students transferred to Glad Park Public School in Stouffville. This school was built after 1960 when the original Dickson's Hill School (built in 1861 as S.S.#17) was relocated to Black Creek Pioneer Village.

References

Neighbourhoods in Markham, Ontario
1805 establishments in Upper Canada